The ICC Men's T20 World Cup Qualifier (previously the ICC World Twenty20 Qualifier) was a Twenty20 International tournament run under the auspices of the International Cricket Council (ICC). The tournament served as the final qualifying event for the ICC Men's T20 World Cup.

The first edition was held in 2008, with only six teams. This was increased to eight teams for the 2010 tournament and to 16 teams for the 2012 and 2013 editions, but reduced to 14 for the 2015 and 2019 editions. For the 2022 ICC Men's T20 World Cup, the ICC opted to conduct two separate qualifiers at different venues, Group A and Group B, of eight teams each.

The number of teams qualifying to the World Cup from the Qualifier has varied based on the tournament model. Ireland and the Netherlands have each won the Qualifier on three occasions. Ireland has the unique distinction of appearing in every tournament, and qualifying for the T20 World Cup from every tournament; as of 2022, Ireland has qualified to the World Cup from the Qualifier on a record seven occasions, while the Netherlands and Afghanistan have qualified four times, Scotland three times, and Hong Kong and Oman twice. Ireland, the Netherlands and Canada are the only teams who have participated in every edition of the Qualifier.

History

2008 Qualifiers

The first ever Twenty20 World Cup Qualifier was played as a Qualifier for 2009 ICC World Twenty20 and was played between 2 August and 5 August 2008 in Stormont, Belfast in Northern Ireland. The top three  played in the 2009 ICC World Twenty20, the international championship of Twenty20 cricket. The six competing teams were: 

The competition was won by Ireland and the Netherlands, who shared the trophy after rain forced the final to be abandoned without a ball bowled. Both teams qualified for the 2009 ICC World Twenty20 finals in England. After the withdrawal of Zimbabwe from the competition, the two finalists were joined by third-placed Scotland.

2010 Qualifiers

The 2010 ICC World Twenty20 Qualifier was played from February 9–13, 2010 in the United Arab Emirates. It was expanded to eight teams, as Afghanistan, the United Arab Emirates, and the United States entered the tournament for the first time, whereas Bermuda did not enter. 

The eight competing teams were:

Afghanistan defeated Ireland in the final to win the championship, and both teams progressed to play in the 2010 ICC World Twenty20, the international championship of Twenty20 cricket in the West Indies.

2012 Qualifiers

The 2012 ICC World Twenty20 Qualifier was played in early 2012. It was an expanded version comprising ten qualifiers from regional Twenty20 tournaments in addition to the six ODI/Twenty20 status countries. A total of 81 countries competed for the ten spots available in the 2012 World Twenty20 Qualifier. The sixteen teams which contested the final qualifying competition were:

Ireland defeated Afghanistan in the final to win the championship, and again both teams progressed to play in the 2012 ICC World Twenty20.

2013 Qualifiers

The 2013 ICC World Twenty20 Qualifier was played in November 2013. It continued to use a 16-team format, with ten qualifiers from regional Twenty20 tournaments plus the top six finishers of the previous competition. Ireland and Afghanistan (by finishing top of their groups), with Nepal and UAE (by winning first runners up knock out matches) and the Netherlands and Hong Kong (5th and 6th place) qualified for the 2014 ICC World Twenty20. The competing countries were:

The top six teams: Ireland, Afghanistan, Netherlands and making their World Twenty20 debut the UAE, Nepal and Hong Kong progressed to the 2014 ICC World Twenty20 tournament.

2015 Qualifiers

The 2015 ICC World Twenty20 Qualifier was played in July 2015 and co-hosted by two countries for the first time, Ireland and Scotland. Both the final and the third-place playoff were abandoned due to rain; Scotland and the Netherlands shared the title, while Ireland were ranked third over Hong Kong due to a superior performance in the group stage. The number of teams at the tournament was reduced to 14, with the African Cricket Association and ICC Americas regional bodies each losing a spot and the ACC gaining one from the European Cricket Council:

The top six teams  Ireland, Scotland, Netherlands, Afghanistan, Hong Kong and Oman who made their debut in the tournament all progressed to the 2016 ICC World Twenty20 tournament.

2019 Qualifiers

The 2019 ICC Men's T20 World Cup Qualifier was played in October–November 2019 in the UAE.

2022 Qualifiers

The 2022 Men's T20 World Cup Qualifiers was played in February and July 2022 in Oman and Zimbabwe respectively.  

The top two teams from each group qualified for 2022 ICC Men's T20 World Cup. 

The 2022 Qualifiers were the last Global Qualifiers before the ICC switched to a regional qualifying model for the 2024 ICC Men's T20 World Cup. 

Group A
 
 
 
 
 
  (H)
 
 

Group B
 
 
 
 
 
 
 
  (H)

Winners
The two associate qualifiers for the inaugural 2007 ICC World Twenty20 were decided in the 2007 World Cricket League Division One tournament. Kenya and Scotland qualified.

Performance by team
Legend
 – Champions
 – Runners-up
 – Third place
 — Hosts
 Teams that qualified for the Men's T20 World Cup are underlined.
Q – Qualified
 —  – Did not participate or failed to qualify 
§ – Team qualified for tournament, but withdrew or disqualified later
× – Did not participate as already qualified for World Cup via another method
 •  – Played in the other group (2022 edition only)

Future
From the 2024 T20 World Cup, the Global Qualifiers were scrapped and teams qualified directly from their regions.

See also
 ICC World Cup Qualifier
 World Cricket League
 ICC Men's T20 World Cup
 International Cricket Council

References

External links

 World Twenty20 Qualifier Website 
  ICC Cricket World Cup 2019 LIve Streaming 
  ICC World Twenty20 Qualifier 2016 Schedule

Qualifier
Twenty20